The Southeastern Railway Museum (initialised SRM, AAR code SMRX) is a railroad museum located in Duluth, Georgia, in suburban Atlanta.

The museum was founded in 1970 by the Atlanta Chapter of the National Railway Historical Society. There are over 90 pieces of rolling stock exhibited on the  site. In 2000, the museum was given the title of being Georgia's official transportation history museum, and the collection of exhibits continues to diversify to reflect this.

In addition to the rolling stock there is a wide variety of railroad artifacts and an extensive archive. The grounds also contain the restored 1871 Duluth passenger train depot, a G16/Park train ride, and a model railroad housed in Building 1. Visitors can also take a brief train ride on restored cabooses over track which runs the length of the property.

Rolling stock collection

Steam locomotives 
Atlanta and West Point Railroad 4-6-2 Heavy Pacific No. 290
Savannah and Atlanta Railway 4-6-2 Light Pacific No. 750
Gainesville Midland Railway 2-10-0 No. 203
Chattahoochee Valley Railroad 2-8-0 No. 21
Stone Mountain Scenic Railroad 4-4-0 General II
Georgia Power USATC 0-6-0T No. 97
Southern Railway 1509 "Maud" 0-4-4T
Campbell Limestone 2-Truck Heisler No. 9

Diesel locomotives
Southern Railway (SOU) EMD SW7 No. 8202
Southern Railway EMD E8 No. 6901
Southern Railway EMD GP30 No. 2594 - currently on lease at TVRM
Armco Steel Baldwin-Westinghouse Boxcab No. B-70
Hartwell Railroad General Electric 44-ton switcher No. 2
New York, Ontario and Western Railway General Electric 44-ton switcher No. 104 (pictured)
Georgia Railroad EMD GP7 No. 1026     (pictured)
Louisville & Nashville ALCO S-4m No. 2326
CSX EMD SD45-2 No. 8954 (ex SCL No. 2049)
SMRX GE 50-Tonner No. 3 (Rebuilt with Cummins engines)

Passenger cars
Norfolk Southern/Central of Georgia No. NS 30 Marco Polo/Savannah, Pullman Company Private Car used by U.S. President Franklin D. Roosevelt between the years of 1933 and 1940
Seaboard Coast Line Railroad No. 301 Superb - Pullman Company Private Car used by U.S. Presidents Warren G. Harding and Woodrow Wilson
Atlantic Coast Line Railroad Sleeper/Lounge Washington Club
Clinchfield Railroad Bar/Lounge car No. 112, Used as a meeting/party car
Southern Railway Diner No. 3168
Southern Railway Coach No. 3780 - painted and lettered as New Georgia Railroad No. 1104
Southern Railway Coach No. 812 Charlottesville
Southern Railway Coach No. 1212
Southern Railway Coach No. 1065
Southern Railway Coach No. 1078
Central of Georgia Coach No. 527
Central of Georgia Coach No. 651 - painted and lettered as New Georgia Railroad No. 1111, In use for on site train rides (Winter only)
Central of Georgia Coach No. 662 - currently on lease to TVRM, AAR reporting mark SMRX 662
Atlantic Coast Line Business car No. 307 - Currently painted and lettered as SMRX No. 307 Georgia On My Mind
Southern Railway 10-1-2 sleeper Thomas Ruffin
Southern Railway 10-6 sleeper No. 2019 Tugalo River Currently lettered as Norfolk Southern "NS17"
Amtrak 24-8 Slumbercoach No. 2092 Loch Arkaig
USAX Troop kitchen car No. 200

Head-end equipment
Southern Railway RPO/Baggage car No. 153, In use as Archive Storage
Southern Railway RPO No. 1701 Grand Junction
Southern Railway Baggage car No. 116
Southern Railway Baggage car No. 451, In use as Archive Storage
Southern Railway Baggage car No. 582
Southern Railway Baggage car No. 6457
Southern Railway Baggage car No. 4529, Used as a meeting/party car
Central of Georgia Railway Baggage car No. 405

Freight cars
Central of Georgia Railway Bulkhead flat No. 11403, Two engine hoods from Hartwell 2, and the cab from Atlanta and West Point 290 are on this car
DODX heavy duty flat car No.38416
Southern Railway flat car No. 117092, Southern Railway 1509's Frame is currently on this car
Southern Railway hopper car No. 74745
Southern Railway "Big John" hopper car No. 8717
Southern Railway 86 ft boxcar No. 9690
Southern Railway gondola No. 900097
Southern Railway gondola No. 291069
Southern Railway boxcar No. 33309
Norfolk Southern hopper car No. 993359
L&N (H.P. Hood and Sons) milk tank car No. 40605
Fruit Growers Express reefer No. 55558
Norfolk and Western gondola No. 99984
Seaboard Air Line boxcar No. 9028
Chattahoochee Valley boxcars Nos. 1010, 9012, 9014, 98703, 98705, 98707, 98708
GATX Kaolin tank car No. 40649

Cabooses
Southern Railway Wood caboose No. 2156
Southern Railway Transfer caboose No. XC7871, In use for on site train rides (Spring, Summer and Fall only)
Georgia Railroad No. 2866
Georgia Railroad Steel braced wood caboose No. 2849
Norfolk and Western No. 500837, In use for on site train rides (Spring, Summer and Fall only)
Clinchfield Railroad No. 1064
Seaboard Coast Line No. 01077
Central of Georgia Wood caboose No. X92

Maintenance-of-way equipment
Seaboard Air Line bunk car No. F70413
Chattahoochee Valley flatcar with burro crane No. 522
Jordan Spreader No. JX635
WofA Pile driver No. 20 with tender No. 7302 and boom car No. 7001
USAX self-propelled crane No. C-271 
Western Union tool car No. 3558-AB

Miscellaneous equipment
L&N M-1 Berkshire Tender No. 1966
L&N Auxiliary Water Tender JLDX No.55 (ex L&N No. 279) 
The collection also includes a Trackmobile.

Transit equipment

Rail vehicles
Metropolitan Atlanta Rapid Transit Authority MARTA CQ 310 heavy rail car No. 509
Georgia Railway and Power Company streetcar No. 269 - Used on the Decatur Line
Georgia Railway and Power Company streetcar No. 636

Rubber-tired vehicles
Atlanta Airport Automated People Mover Westinghouse C-100 vehicles Nos. 1 and 53
Atlanta Transit System Trackless trolley No. 1296
Atlanta Transit System Nos. 1732 and 1756
BC Transit CCF-Brill T-44 Trackless trolley No. 2207
Cobb Community Transit RTS bus No. 8956
Gwinnett County Transit Orion VII 32.5' CNG bus No. B014

MARTA-owned vehicles
Mule streetcar No. 1866
Georgia Power Company 1941 White, bus No. 401
Atlanta Transit Company 1956 GMC, bus No. 253
Atlanta Transit System 1963 GMC, bus No. 946
MARTA Flxible Metro bus No. 3360
MARTA New Flyer 40' CNG bus No. 2701 
MARTA GMC "Fishbowl" bus No. 4211

Special events
The museum hosts a series of annual special events, including Caboose Days in April, the Fast Track 5K in May, Locomotive Celebration in June, Trains, Trucks & Tractors in August and Classics at the Crossing in October.

See also
 List of heritage railroads in the United States

References

External links

 Southeastern Railway Museum
 HawkinsRails' SRM scrapbook

Railroad museums in Georgia (U.S. state)
Museums in Gwinnett County, Georgia
Transportation museums in Georgia (U.S. state)
Symbols of Georgia (U.S. state)